Giorgi Chogovadze (born 25 April 1969) is a Soviet diver. He competed at the 1988 Summer Olympics and the 1992 Summer Olympics.

References

External links
 

1969 births
Living people
Soviet male divers
Olympic divers of the Soviet Union
Olympic divers of the Unified Team
Divers at the 1988 Summer Olympics
Divers at the 1992 Summer Olympics
Sportspeople from Tbilisi
World Aquatics Championships medalists in diving